WKWF (1600 AM) is a radio station broadcasting a classic jazz standards format.  Licensed to Key West, Florida, United States, the station serves the Florida Keys area.  WKWF was founded in 1944 by John Maloney Spottswood, who was Sheriff of Monroe County and later State Senator.  The station is currently owned by Spottswood Partners II,

References

External links

Sports radio stations in the United States
KWF
1944 establishments in Florida
Radio stations established in 1944